Egerton Capital is a British hedge fund.

Egerton Capital was founded in 1994 by John Armitage and William Bollinger. Armitage is the chief investment officer and a co-founder.

As of November 2014, it had 23 employees. They are based at Stratton House, 5 Stratton Street, Mayfair, London, W1.

In the year to 31 March 2014, Egerton made a profit of £141.4 million, which was divided between its 12 partners.

As of 31 March 2019, Egerton had $19.8 billion in assets under management.

References

External links
 

Hedge funds
Financial services companies established in 1994
British companies established in 1994
Private equity firms of the United Kingdom
Companies based in the City of Westminster
Financial services companies based in London
Employee-owned companies of the United Kingdom
Tiger Management